Johan Carlsson (born 29 January 1966) is a former professional tennis player from Sweden.

Career
Carlsson reached his first and only final on tour in the 1986 Japan Open, finishing runner-up. His previous best performance had come at the same tournament a year earlier, when he made the semi-finals. In 1986 he was also a quarter-finalist at Washington

He defeated both Slobodan Živojinović and countryman Tobias Svantesson in the 1988 US Open, to make the third round, where he was knocked out of the tournament by Stefan Edberg. It was his best showing in a Grand Slam.

In 1989 he made the quarter-finals at Nancy and along the way defeated top seed Darren Cahill.

Carlsson reached two further quarter-finals in 1991, in Tel Aviv and Washington.

He had wins over two top 20 players during his career. At Key Biscayne in 1987 he upset world number 13 Mikael Pernfors and in the 1992 Cincinnati Open he defeated local MaliVai Washington, then ranked 16th in the world.

Grand Prix career finals

Challenger titles

Doubles: (3)

References

External links
 
 

1966 births
Living people
Swedish male tennis players
Sportspeople from Linköping